Aristogeitonia is a plant genus in the family Picrodendraceae, described as a genus in 1908. It is native to Africa and Madagascar.

species
 Aristogeitonia gabonica - Gabon
 Aristogeitonia limoniifolia - Angola
 Aristogeitonia lophirifolia - Madagascar
 Aristogeitonia magnistipula - Tanzania
 Aristogeitonia monophylla - Tanzania, Kenya
 Aristogeitonia perrieri - Madagascar
 Aristogeitonia uapacifolia - Toliara Province

See also
Taxonomy of the Picrodendraceae

References

Picrodendraceae
Malpighiales genera
Flora of Africa